Benjamin David Santer (born June 3, 1955) is a climate researcher at Lawrence Livermore National Laboratory and former researcher at the University of East Anglia's Climatic Research Unit. He also worked at the Max Planck Institute for Meteorology from 1987 to 1992. He specializes mainly in statistical analysis of climate data sets, and detection/attribution of climate change forcings.

Since 2012, Santer has been listed on the board of directors of the National Center for Science Education.

Honors
Santer received a B.Sc. in Environmental Sciences and a 1987 Ph.D. in Climatology from the Climatic Research Unit of the University of East Anglia.

In 1998 Santer was awarded a MacArthur Fellowship for research supporting the finding that human activity contributes to global warming. He has also received the Ernest Orlando Lawrence Award and a Distinguished Scientist Fellowship from the U.S. Department of Energy and the Norbert Gerbier/MUMM award from the World Meteorological Organization. He ranked twelfth amongst climate scientists in a 2002 assessment of most cited scientists in the field of global warming.

In 2011, Santer was elected as a fellow of the American Geophysical Union and as a member of the National Academy of Sciences.

1995 AR2 Chapter 8 

Santer was the convening Lead Author of Chapter 8 of 1995 IPCC Working Group I Report (AR2 WGI), which addressed the global warming issue.

In a June 12, 1996 editorial-page piece in The Wall Street Journal, Frederick Seitz, chair of the George C. Marshall Institute and Science and Environmental Policy Project, claimed that alterations made to Chapter 8 of the 1995 IPCC report were made to "deceive policy makers and the public into believing that the scientific evidence shows human activities are causing global warming." Similar charges were made by the Global Climate Coalition (GCC), a consortium of industry interests; specifically, they accused Santer of "scientific cleansing."

Santer and 40 other scientists responded to The Wall Street Journal that all IPCC procedural rules were followed, and that IPCC procedures required changes to the draft in response to comments from governments, individual scientists, and non-governmental organizations. They stated that the pre- and post-Madrid versions of Chapter 8 were equally cautious in their statements; that roughly 20% of Chapter 8 is devoted to the discussion of uncertainties in estimates of natural climate variability and the expected signal due to human activities; and that both versions of the chapter reached the same conclusion: "Taken together, these results point towards a human influence on climate."

Gold Standard Paper 

On February 25, 2019 Santer et al. published the paper Celebrating the anniversary of three key events in climate change science in Nature Climate Change, claiming to have reached the 5-sigma "gold standard level" of statistical proof of human influence in global climate change using three sets of satellite data.

References and notes

Further reading
 Santer, BD, Wigley, TML, Barnett TP, and Anyamba, E (1995). Detection of climate change and attribution of causes, in Houghton, JT et al.. Climate Change 1995, Cambridge Univ. Press.
"Benjamin David Santer." Marquis Who's Who TM. Marquis Who's Who, 2009. Reproduced in Biography Resource Center. Farmington Hills, Michigan: Gale, 2009. http://galenet.galegroup.com/servlet/BioRC Document Number: K2017060303. Fee. Accessed 2009-10-22 via Fairfax County Public Library.

External links
The Many Travails of Ben Santer, Paul D. Thacker, Environmental Science & Technology
2002 Interview
Communication between Santer and others about Global Warming
National Energy Research Science Computer Center article on Santer (starts page 38)
Recent (2011) research by Santer on separating signal and noise in atmospheric temperature changes

Living people
MacArthur Fellows
American climatologists
Intergovernmental Panel on Climate Change lead authors
1955 births
Alumni of the University of East Anglia
Lawrence Livermore National Laboratory staff
Members of the United States National Academy of Sciences
Fellows of the American Meteorological Society